The five-lined constellation fish (Bathysidus pentagrammus) is species of fish that was described by William Beebe on 11 August 1934, being spotted by the biologist as he descended to a depth of 580 metres (1900 feet) of the coast of Bermuda.

Background
The “bathysphere,” as termed by Beebe was a new yet primitive invention. It was a rounded steel enclosure with space adequate for two people, its external layer being 3 centimetres thick. On the side, there was a single window, fifteen centimetres across. It was fitted with a heavy steel door that had to be bolted on. With no manoeuvrability, the navigation of this steel submersible was solely dependent on the ship it had been attached to. Beebe had no camera brought with him to these great depth, and instead described the species in detail to Else Bostelmann, an artist who proceeded to illustrate his findings.

Encounter

The fish was seen in solitude. It was described by Beebe as resembling a surgeon or butterflyfish. It was disc-like in appearance with a 12 cm high and 15 cm across. Its fins were continuous and vertical; its eyes large. Bebe was intrigued by this fish’s striking bioluminescence, which he described in the book Half Mile Down: "along the sides of the body were five unbelievably beautiful lines of light ... each line was composed of a series of large, pale yellow lights, and every one of these was surrounded by a semicircle of very small, but intensely purple photophores
."

Explicitly impressed with its luminescence, Beebe assigned the fish a taxonomic name,  Bathysidus pentagrammus. When translated, it roughly means “five-lined star of the depths”. He then states that “in his memory it will live throughout his life as one of the loveliest things he has ever seen.”

Status of existence

Of the six new fish described by Beebe, none of them were confirmed to exist. His colleague Otis Barton, who descended with him in the submersible, attested he had also seen them. 

Ichtyologist Carl Hubbs has proposed that the creature encountered by Beebe was not a fish at all, rather a Ctenophore, or “comb jelly”. He proposed that the distortion caused by the small viewing window could have caused the comb jelly to appear narrower, and cause its distinctive luminous lines to have been intensified.

More than 80 years onwards, this fish has found itself in a taxonomic limbo and has been deemed a hypothetical species or a cryptid by many.

See also 

 Bathyembryx
 Bathysphaera

References

Controversial taxa